The Peugeot Hoggar is a coupé utility produced by Peugeot as a variant of their front-engined, front wheel drive Peugeot 206 for the Brazilian and South American market. It was produced by Usine PSA of Porto Real, Brazil from 2010 to 2014.

Engines
 1.4 8V Flex-Fuel 82 cv (petrol or ethanol)
 1.6 16V Flex-Fuel 113 cv (petrol or ethanol)

References

External links

Hoggar
Cars of Brazil